Leon Šipoš (born 28 February 2000) is a Croatian footballer who plays as a forward for Italian  club Trento.

Career
As a youth player, Šipoš joined the youth academy of Dinamo (Zagreb), Croatia's most successful club.

In 2017, he was sent on loan to Gorica (Croatia) in the Croatian second division.

In 2020, he signed for Latvian side Spartaks after receiving interest from England and Russia.

Before the second half of 2020–21 season, Šipoš signed for Istra in the Croatian top flight on loan.

On 20 August 2021, he joined Italian Serie C club Catania on loan with an option to buy. On 9 April 2022, his loan to Catania was cut short following the club's exclusion from Italian football due to its inability to overcome a number of financial issues.

On 5 August 2022, Šipoš moved on a new loan to Fidelis Andria in Serie C, with an option to buy.

On 7 January 2023, Šipoš signed a 2.5-year contract with Serie C club Trento.

References

External links
 
 

2000 births
Living people
Sportspeople from Varaždin
Association football forwards
Croatian footballers
Croatia youth international footballers
HNK Gorica players
GNK Dinamo Zagreb players
GNK Dinamo Zagreb II players
FK Spartaks Jūrmala players
NK Istra 1961 players
Catania S.S.D. players
S.S. Fidelis Andria 1928 players
A.C. Trento 1921 players
Croatian Football League players
First Football League (Croatia) players
Latvian Higher League players
Serie C players
Croatian expatriate footballers
Expatriate footballers in Latvia
Croatian expatriate sportspeople in Latvia
Expatriate footballers in Italy
Croatian expatriate sportspeople in Italy